The Shire of Fitzroy was a local government area located in the Capricornia region of Central Queensland, Queensland, Australia, to the immediate west and south of the regional city of Rockhampton. It is named for the Fitzroy River, that passes along the northern boundary of the shire.

History

On 11 November 1879, the Gogango Division was established as one of 74 divisions around Queensland under the Divisional Boards Act 1879. On 6 April 1899, the section of Gogango south of the Fitzroy River split away to form the Fitzroy Division.

With the passage of the Local Authorities Act 1902, Fitzroy Division became the Shire of Fitzroy on 31 March 1903.

On 15 March 2008, under the Local Government (Reform Implementation) Act 2007 passed by the Parliament of Queensland on 10 August 2007, the Shire of Fitzroy merged with the City of Rockhampton and the Shires of Mount Morgan and Livingstone to form the Rockhampton Region.

At the time of amalgamation, the Shire of Fitzroy was the only local government area in Queensland without a library service.

Towns and localities
The Shire of Fitzroy included the following settlements:

 Gracemere
 Alton Downs
 Bajool
 Bouldercombe
 Bushley
 Dalma
 Garnant
 Glenroy
 Gogango
 Kabra
 Kalapa
 Marmor
 Midgee
 Morinish
 Morinish South
 Nine Mile
 Pink Lily
 Port Alma
 Ridgelands
 Stanwell
 Westwood
 Wycarbah

Chairmen

1899: Thomas Richard Avalon Creed
1903: William Wells
1913: Michael Leahy
1908; 1918; 1924 - 1930: John Walsh O'Shanesy
1930 - 1933: Edward Walker Archer
1933 - 1936: John Henry Salmon
1936 - 1943: John Beck
1943 - 1949: John Gay O'Shanesy
1949 - 1975: Richard (Richie) Edward Pierce (died in office)
1975 - 1982; 1988 - 1994; 1997 - 2000: Ian Besch
1982 - 1985: Robert Cedric Mackenzie Archer
1994 - 1997: Mary Lilliendal Seierup
2000 - 2004: Donald Edward Close
2004 - 2008: John Hopkins

Population

References

External links
 University of Queensland: Queensland Places: Fitzroy Shire

Fitzroy
2008 disestablishments in Australia
Populated places disestablished in 2008